Lawrence Ifeanyi Ugwuanyi  CON (popularly known as "Gburugburu") (born 20 March 1964) is a Nigerian politician who was elected as the Governor of Enugu State in April 2015, and was sworn on 29 May 2015.  He was a member of the House of Representatives of the Federal Republic of Nigeria for 12 years. He is a member of People's Democratic Party (PDP) who re-presented Igboeze North/Udenu Federal Constinuency of Enugu State. Ugwuanyi was elected the Governor of Enugu State under the PDP. He was sworn in as the governor of Enugu State for a second tenure on May 29, 2019.

Early life and education
Ugwuanyi was born in March 1964 and is from Orba Town in Udenu Local Government Area of Enugu North Zone in Enugu State. He attended St. Theresa's College, Nsukka. He holds bachelor's degree and master's degree in Business Administration from University of Nigeria, Nsukka.

Ugwuanyi was the General Manager of Premier Insurance Brokers Limited Enugu and has also been the president of the Rotary Club of Emene in Enugu State.

Political career
Ugwuanyi was first elected to the House of Representatives of Nigeria in 2003 and he was the chairman, House Committee on Marine Transport.

Ugwuanyi was a two term Chairman of house committee on Marine Transport. Ugwuanyi also held the position of Deputy Chairman of the House Committee on Pensions where he helped enact the Pension Reform Act 2004.

Following his party's primary election of 8 December 2014 in Enugu, Ugwuanyi won PDP's gubernatorial ticket, which made him the State's PDP Governorship Candidate for the 2015 General Elections. However, another PDP gubernatorial aspirant, Senator Ayogu Eze, was  displeased with the conduct of the primaries. Eze went to court to challenge the legitimacy of Ugwuanyi's emergence as the PDP's flag-bearer for Enugu State Governorship Elections. Eze's petition was dismissed by Justice Evoh Stephen Chukwu, an Abuja Federal High Court Judge, who ruled that Ugwuanyi's election in the gubernatorial primary was legitimate and legally binding.

Ugwuanyi who was sworn in on May 29, 2015, as Governor has initiated some approaches to develop and transform Enugu State. One of those initiatives was his recent oversea trip to Ireland for an investment summit organised by Metro Eireann Dublin. He was also the recipient of Metro Eireann International Outstanding Leadership Award 2016 for his exemplary performances as a legislator, especially as the Chairman of Marine Transport, during his time in the House of Parliament of the Federal Republic of Nigeria.

On March 9, 2019, Uguwuanyi was re-elected as Governor of Enugu State in the 2019 Nigerian gubernatorial  election. He polled 449,935 votes which was higher than his opponent, Senator Ayogu Eze who scored 10,423 votes.

Achievements  
Although Governor Ugwanyi encountered many obstacles at the commencement of his administration, he has proven his leadership prowess following the way he has been managing the state. Amidst sentimental backlash mainly from Enugu North, the governor has maintained the developmental trajectories of Enugu. As the past governors since 1999 had focused on urban development, Ugwanyi turned his attention to rural development. Within his first tenure, he completed the Udenu Ring Road which had been a death trap for most the people of Ezimo and Imilike-Ani. The completion of this road has opened up these towns to the outside world for business and other transactions. He engaged in this capital-intensive project when some States were not able to pay workers' salaries.

The unsung hero of infrastructure, has continued with his aggressive execution of legacy projects- projects that impact directly on the people. Some of these projects include the completion of the Nike Lake junction – Harmony Estate Road – Amorji Nike – Adoration Pilgrimage Centre, Phase II and III, in Enugu East LGA, which will link Abakpa and Emene and serve as a critical bypass that will decongest traffic gridlock at Abakpa T-junction; the asphalting of a  inter-community link road – the Neke-Mbu-Ogbodu Aba-ObolloEtiti road – that connects Isi-Uzo and Udenu LGA, under the Rural Access and Mobility Project II (RAMP II); rehabilitation of numerous internal roads in the university town of Nsukka and the flood routing/erosion control works at Achi Street, Independence Layout, Enugu.

See also
List of Governors of Enugu State

Award 

In October 2022, a Nigerian national honour of Commander Of The Order Of The Niger (CON) was conferred on him by President Muhammadu Buha.ri

References

Peoples Democratic Party state governors of Nigeria
Members of the House of Representatives (Nigeria)
1964 births
Living people
Igbo people
Igbo politicians
Nigerian Roman Catholics
People from Enugu
People from Enugu State
Governors of Enugu State
University of Nigeria alumni